The 2015 Grand Prix Cycliste de Montréal was the sixth edition of the Grand Prix Cycliste de Montréal one-day cycling race. It took place on 13 September and was the twenty-sixth race of the 2015 UCI World Tour.

It was won by Tim Wellens in the sprint before Adam Yates. Rui Costa won the sprint for the third place.

Teams

As the Grand Prix Cycliste de Québec was a UCI World Tour event, all 17 UCI ProTeams were invited automatically and obligated to send a squad. Three UCI Professional Continental teams (Bora-Argon 18, Drapac, and Team Europcar) and a Canadian national squad also competed in the race, and as such, forming the event's 21-team peloton.

The 21 teams that competed in the race were:

Canada (national team) †

Results

References

Grand Prix Cycliste de Montréal
Grand Prix Cycliste de Montreal
Grand Prix Cycliste de Montreal
2015 in Quebec
September 2015 sports events in Canada